Gustavo A. Madero is the northernmost borough (demarcación territorial) of Mexico City.

History
Founded as "Villa de Guadalupe" in 1563, it became the city of "Villa de Guadalupe Hidalgo" in 1828, and finally a delegación in 1931. It was named after Gustavo A. Madero, the brother and fellow revolutionary of President Francisco I. Madero.

The Treaty of Guadalupe Hidalgo, which ended the Mexican–American War of 1846–1848, was signed in Gustavo A. Madero.

Points of interest
The area houses the Basílica de Guadalupe, the shrine of Our Lady of Guadalupe at the foot of Tepeyac Hill, where Roman Catholics believe the Virgin Mary appeared to the indigenous Mexican Juan Diego Cuauhtlatoatzin in 1531.

Being the northernmost borough, the Northern Central Bus Station (Terminal Central del Norte) is located here, providing constant bus service to all major cities in the northern and western part of the country.

On Sundays, the San Felipe de Jesús Tianguis in the neighborhood of the same name, is Latin America's largest tianguis or street market, with 30,000 vendors and stretching seven kilometers.

Education
Public high schools of the Instituto de Educación Media Superior del Distrito Federal (IEMS) include:
Escuela Preparatoria Gustavo A. Madero I "Belisario Domínguez"
Escuela Preparatoria Gustavo A. Madero II "Salvador Allende"

Private schools:
Multiple campuses of the Sistema Educativo Justo Sierra: Acueducto (Laguna Ticomán), Aragón (San Juan de Aragón), and Insurgentes (Lindavista)
Colegio Guadalupe in Lindavista
Escuela Cristóbal Colón de la Salle (three campuses)
Instituto Ovalle Monday S. C. (preschool through junior high school, including elementary schools in Lindavista)

Climate

References

External links

 Alcaldía de Gustavo A. Madero website

 
Boroughs of Mexico City
Populated places established in 1563
1563 establishments in New Spain